Lieutenant General Donald M. Campbell Jr. (born January 3, 1955) is a retired United States Army lieutenant general who served as the commanding general of United States Army Europe. He commanded the United States Army Europe from December 1, 2012 to November 6, 2014.

Military career
Campbell is graduate of Kansas State University. Commissioned an armor officer in May 1978, his initial assignment was with the 2nd Battalion, 63rd Armor at Fort Riley, Kansas, where he served as a Tank Platoon Leader, Company Executive Officer, Battalion S1/Adjutant and Company Commander

In June 1984, Campbell was assigned as a G1 (Personnel) Staff Officer at the 8th Infantry Division in Bad Kreuznach, Germany. In 1985, he was reassigned as the S3/Operations Officer for 4th Battalion, 69th Armor Regiment in Mainz, Germany. He was then selected as the Aide-de-Camp to the Commanding General, 8th Infantry Division in Bad Kreuznach. In June 1987, Campbell was reassigned to Armor Branch, U.S. Army Military Personnel Center in Alexandria, Virginia, later renamed U.S. Army Personnel Command, where he served as the captains' and later the majors' Assignment Officer of the Armor Branch, Combat Arms Division.

Following graduation from the Command and General Staff College at Fort Leavenworth in June 1991, Campbell was assigned as the G3 (Operations) Chief of Plans Officer for 1st Infantry Division at Fort Riley, Kansas. He was then assigned as the Executive Officer for the 4th Battalion, 37th Armor Regiment, and later the 2nd Brigade S3/Operations Officer. In June 1994, Campbell was selected to serve as the Executive Officer to the Commanding General, PERSCOM. After he was selected for battalion command, Campbell served as the G3 (Operations) Assistant Training Officer for I Corps at Fort Lewis, Washington. In January 1996, he assumed command of 1st Battalion, 33rd Armor Regiment, a part of 3rd Brigade, 2nd Infantry Division at Fort Lewis. Campbell next served as the Deputy Brigade Commander of 3rd Brigade, 2nd Infantry Division. His following assignment was as the Deputy Director of Staff Operations for the Supreme Headquarters Allied Powers Europe in Mons, Belgium. He assumed command of the 1st Brigade, 4th Infantry Division, in June 2001, with the "Raider Brigade" as a key element in Task Force Ironhorse operations during Operation Iraqi Freedom. Following brigade command, he served as the Chief of Staff for 4th Infantry Division until June 2004.

Campbell then served as Deputy Commanding General-West for U.S. Army Recruiting Command from July 2004 through May 2005. In June 2005, he was selected to serve as the Chief of Staff, V Corps with duty as the Multi-National Corps Iraq Chief of Staff from January through December 2006. In July 2007 he assumed duties as the Deputy Commanding General, I Corps. Before assuming command of the U.S. Army Recruiting Command in May 2009, he was Commanding General, U.S. Army Armor Center and Fort Knox.

On March 10, 2011, it was announced that Campbell would take over as the III Corps and Fort Hood Commanding General from Lieutenant General Robert Cone. Campbell took command of III Corps in Fort Hood, TX in April 2011. He held this position until November 2012 when he relinquished command to go take charge of United States Army Europe, newly headquartered in Wiesbaden, Germany.

Campbell is a graduate of the Armor Officer Basic Course, Infantry Officer Advanced Course, U.S. Army Command and General Staff College, and the U.S. Army War College. He holds a master's degree in Administration from Central Michigan University.

Campbell planned to move to North Carolina, where he and his wife owned a house.

Awards and decorations
Campbell's decorations include:

  Army Distinguished Service Medal with three Oak Leaf Clusters
  Legion of Merit with three Oak Leaf Clusters
  Bronze Star Medal with V device and one Oak Leaf Cluster
  Defense Meritorious Service Medal
  Meritorious Service Medal with a silver Oak Leaf Cluster
  Army Commendation Medal with two Oak Leaf Clusters
  Army Achievement Medal with one Oak Leaf Cluster

References

External links

Official biography, April 2011, of Lieutenant General Donald M. Campbell Jr. at III Corps
U.S. Army Europe Command Page

United States Army generals
Living people
Kansas State University alumni
Central Michigan University alumni
Recipients of the Legion of Merit
Recipients of the Distinguished Service Medal (US Army)
1955 births
Recipients of the Meritorious Service Medal (United States)